Simion is a Romanian-language masculine given name. Notable people with this name include:
Simion Bărnuțiu
Simion Bughici
Simion Coman
Simion Cuciuc
Simion Cuţov
Simion Furdui
Simion Galeţchi
Simion Ghimpu
Simion Grişciuc
Simion Ismailciuc
Simion Florea Marian
Simeon G. Murafa
Nae-Simion Pleşca
Simion Popescu
Simon Schobel
Simion Stanciu
Simion Stoilow
Simion Stolnicu

It may also work as a surname:
Adrian Simion
Eugen Simion
George Simion

Arts & media
"Simion", a 1996 episode of the American animated series Dexter's Laboratory

See also 
 
 Simeon

Romanian masculine given names
Romanian-language surnames